Sundra is a settlement in Victor Khanye Local Municipality on the border of the Mpumalanga province of South Africa.

References

Populated places in the Victor Khanye Local Municipality